CoolSprings Galleria is an enclosed super-regional shopping mall in the Cool Springs commercial and residential corridor between Franklin and Brentwood, Tennessee,  south of Nashville. Opened in 1991, it features 150 stores. The anchor stores are JCPenney, 2 Belk stores, H&M, American Girl, Ulta Beauty, Dillard's, Forever 21, and Macy's. The major tenant is The Cheesecake Factory. CBL Properties developed the mall in a joint venture with the Edward J. DeBartolo Corporation, and has owned it since its opening; CBL also owns an adjacent power center called CoolSprings Crossing which was developed simultaneously.

History
CBL & Associates Properties (now CBL Properties), a shopping mall developer based in Chattanooga, Tennessee, first announced plans to build a shopping mall in Franklin, Tennessee in 1989. It would be situated at the interchange of Interstate 65 and Moores Lane (Tennessee State Route 441). CBL developed the mall through a joint venture with the Edward J. DeBartolo Corporation. The original plans for the mall included three anchor stores: Castner Knott (later became Proffitt's/Hecht's/Macy's), Dillard's (which also opened at The Avenues), and Sears, with additional space for up to two more. Coinciding with development of the mall, three other stores were confirmed for the surrounding area: Target and Service Merchandise at an adjacent power center called CoolSprings Crossing, and The Home Depot across Interstate 65.

In May 2011, it was announced that TIAA-CREF would receive 50% ownership of the mall and several other CBL malls in an attempt to reduce CBL's debt. Sears closed its store there in 2013 and sold it to CBL, who plans to redevelop the space.

References

External links
CoolSprings Galleria official website

1991 establishments in Tennessee
Buildings and structures in Williamson County, Tennessee
CBL Properties
Shopping malls established in 1991
Shopping malls in Tennessee
Tourist attractions in Williamson County, Tennessee